Priyanga Amarasekare is a Professor of Ecology and Evolutionary Biology at the University of California, Los Angeles (UCLA) and distinguished Fellow of the Ecological Society of America (ESA). Her research is in the fields of mathematical biology and trophic ecology, with a focus on understanding patterns of biodiversity, species dispersal and the impacts of climate change. She received a 2021 Guggenheim Fellowship and received ESA's Robert H. MacArthur Award in 2022.

Career 
Amarasekare earned a Master of Science in Zoology from the University of Hawai'i at Manoa in 1991. Her thesis was titled Potential impact of mammalian nest predators on Mamane-Naio woodland birds of Mauna Kea, Hawaii. After her PhD, she worked at the University of Chicago.

Amarasekare is a Professor of Ecology and Evolutionary Biology at the University of California, Los Angeles (UCLA). Her research focuses on biological and ecological mechanisms that maintain biological diversity in variable environments and how understanding of these dynamics can predict how patterns of diversity may change in variable environments.

Her work is distinguished for its strong mechanistic focus combined with a tight integration between theory and data. She has been a leading figure in the field of mathematical biology as her studies have sought to find results that definitively highlight the non-linearities of biological systems through mathematical analyses. Amarasekare's work has made significant contributions to the dynamics of population regulation, species interactions and the evolution of dispersal, as well as the effect of climate change on the diversity of multi-trophic communities.

From 2004 to 2005, Amarasekare served as the vice chair officer of the Ecological Society of America's Theory Section. She subsequently served as Chair Officer of the Theory Section from 2005 to 2006.

In 2017, Amarasekare was named a Fellow of the Ecological Society of America for "distinguished contributions to theoretical ecology, particularly our understanding of the spatial and temporal dynamics of populations and communities."

Following administrative hearings in September 2021, UCLA suspended Amarasekare for one year without pay beginning in June 2022. The university did not publicly disclose the reasons for her suspension, and prohibited her from disclosing them either. More than 300 scientists from around the world signed a January 2023 petition calling for Amarasekare's reinstatement.

Selected publications 
 The metacommunity concept: a framework for multi‐scale community ecology. Ecology letters, 7(7), 601–613.
 Why intraspecific trait variation matters in community ecology. Trends in ecology & evolution, 26(4), 183–192.
 Pollen limitation of plant reproduction: ecological and evolutionary causes and consequences. Ecology, 85(9), 2408–2421.
 Competitive coexistence in spatially structured environments: a synthesis. Ecology letters, 6(12), 1109–1122.
 Spatial heterogeneity, source-sink dynamics, and the local coexistence of competing species. The American Naturalist, 158(6), 572–584.

Public engagement and outreach 
In late 2020, Priyanga Amarasekare joined Frontiers Media as a Specialty Chief Editor for Frontiers in Ecology and Evolution’s specialty section, Models in Ecology and Evolution. Through this position, Amarasekare hopes to promote efforts to increase diversity and inclusion in the field of Mathematical Biology and encourage scientists from under-represented groups to publish their work.

Amarasekare is also a member of the Ecological Society of America Diversity Committee from 2021-2023, and was elected as the 2022-2024 Vice President of the American Society of Naturalists. She ran for this position on a platform of  "develop[ing] measures to increase the representation of scientists from developing countries, particularly Asia, Africa and the Middle East, both as members of the society and contributors to The American Naturalist".

References

External links 
 

Year of birth missing (living people)
Living people
University of California, Los Angeles faculty
Fellows of the Ecological Society of America
Women evolutionary biologists
Women ecologists
University of Hawaiʻi at Mānoa alumni